John Proctor (1871 – 8 November 1893) was an English footballer who played in the Football League for Stoke.

Career
Proctor was born in Stoke-upon-Trent and played for Dresden United before joining Stoke in 1891. He looked to be establishing himself as a potential great full back and played in every match during the 1892–93 season helping Stoke to claim their highest position to that point of 7th. However, after playing 10 matches in the following campaign Proctor fell ill with pneumonia and died at the age of 22. He was a married man, and not long before his death had taken on the tenancy of a pub, the Crown Inn at Fenton.

Career statistics

References

1871 births
1893 deaths
People from Dresden, Staffordshire
English footballers
Association football defenders
Dresden United F.C. players
Stoke City F.C. players
English Football League players
Date of birth missing
Place of death missing
Deaths from pneumonia in England